The 2002 Deutsche Tourenwagen Masters was the sixteenth season of premier German touring car championship and also third season under the moniker of Deutsche Tourenwagen Masters since the series' resumption in 2000. There were ten race weekends with two races; a 30 km qualifying race and a 100 km main race at each event.

Laurent Aïello was the Drivers Champion driving an Audi, and HWA Team were the Teams Champion utilising Mercedes Benz cars.

Changes for 2002
Rule Changes 
 Standing starts were introduced for the first time.
 Formula One points system was adopted.
 HANS devices were mandatory for all drivers.

Calendar Changes 
 Only one race would now take place at the Nürburgring.
 Oschersleben was removed from the calendar.
 Donington Park and Zolder were added to the calendar.

Teams and drivers
The following manufacturers, teams and drivers competed in the 2002 Deutsche Tourenwagen Masters. All teams competed with tyres supplied by Dunlop.

Race calendar and winners
Six rounds would be held in Germany, with the remainder in Belgium, Great Britain, Austria and the Netherlands.  Both races at Hockenheim would take place on the new circuit for the first time.

Championship standings
Scoring system
Each round featured a "Qualifying Race", and the "Main Race".

In the "Qualifying Race", the top 3 finishers were awarded points as follows;

In the "Main Race", the top 6 finishers were awarded points as follows;

Drivers' championship

† — Driver retired, but was classified as they completed 90% of the winner's race distance.

Teams' championship

References

External links

 Official DTM website

Deutsche Tourenwagen Masters seasons
Deutsche Tourenwagen Masters